Richard H. Baker may refer to:

 Richard Baker (U.S. politician) (Richard Hugh Baker, born 1948), U.S. Representative from Louisiana
 Richard H. Baker (bishop) (1897–1981), Episcopal bishop of North Carolina
 Richard H. Baker, inventor of an electronic circuit called the "Baker clamp"